Sam Eggington (born 15 October 1993) is a British professional boxer. He held the IBO Light Middleweight title in 2022. He has previously held the British and Commonwealth welterweight titles from 2015 to 2016, and the European welterweight title in 2017.

Professional career

Eggington vs. Molina 
Sam Eggington fought and beat Carlos Molina by unanimous decision on 22 May 2021. The scorecards were announced as 116-112, 119-109, 117-111 in favor of Eggington.

Egginton vs. Jkitou 
On 10 September 2021, Sam Eggington beat Bilel Jkitou by split decision. The scorecards read 117-112, 117-111, 112-116 in favor of Eggington.

Eggington vs. Zysk 
On 25 June 2022, Sam Eggington beat Przemyslaw Zysk by unanimous decision in their 12 round contest. Egginton won 119-109, 119-109, 117-111 on the scorecards.

Professional boxing record

References

External links

Sam Eggington - Profile, News Archive & Current Rankings at Box.Live

1993 births
Living people
English male boxers
Boxers from Birmingham, West Midlands
Welterweight boxers
Light-middleweight boxers
Middleweight boxers
British Boxing Board of Control champions
Commonwealth Boxing Council champions
European Boxing Union champions